Pea Island is a small island in Long Island Sound and a part of the city of New Rochelle in Westchester County, New York. It features a rocky, grass-covered terrain, with exposed rocks at low tide. It is the southernmost location in New Rochelle.

Pea Island was once owned by the Huguenot Yacht Club which is based on nearby Neptune Island in New Rochelle's "Lower Harbor". A 1992 storm destroyed most of the club's structures on the Island.

In June 2019, Pea Island and nearby Columbia Island were jointly put on sale with a list price of $13 million.

References

External links

Geography of New Rochelle, New York
Long Island Sound
Islands of Westchester County, New York
Islands of New York (state)
Private islands of New York (state)